The 2023 Incarnate Word Cardinals softball team represents the University of the Incarnate Word during the 2023 NCAA Division I softball season. The Cardinals play their home games at H-E-B Field and are led by second-year head coach Kimberly Dean. They are members of the Southland Conference.

Preseason

Southland Conference Coaches Poll
The Southland Conference Coaches Poll was released on January 26, 2023. Incarnate Word was picked to finish eighth in the Southland Conference with 45 votes.

Preseason All-Southland team
The Cardinals had one player named to the Southland Conference preseason second team.

First Team
Crislyne Moreno (MCNS, SO, 1st Base)
Caleigh Cross  (MCNS, SR, 2nd Base)
Jil Poullard (MCNS, JR, 3rd Base)
Maddie Watson (SELA, SO, Shortstop)
Bailey Krolczyk (SELA, JR, Catcher)
Kaylee Lopez (MCNS, SR, Utility)
Audrey Greely (SELA, JR, Designated Player)
Laney Roos (NSU, JR, Outfielder)
Alayis Seneca (MCNS, SR, Outfielder)
Cam Goodman (SELA, JR, Outfielder)
Ashley Vallejo (MCNS, JR, Pitcher)
Bronte Rhoden (NSU, SR, Pitcher)

Second Team
Sydney Hoyt (TAMUCC, JR, 1st Base)
Madison Rayner (SELA, SR, 2nd Base)
Haylie Savage (HCU, SO, 3rd Base)
Ryleigh Mata (UIW, SO, Shortstop)
Tristin Court (NSU, JR, Catcher)
Melise Gossen (NICH, SR, Utility)
Chloe Gomez (MCNS, JR, Designated Player)
Alexa Poche (NICH, JR, Outfielder)
Makenzie Chaffin (NSU, JR, Outfielder)
Bailie Ragsdale (NSU, SO, Outfielder)
Lyndie Swanson (HCU, JR, Pitcher)
Siarah Galvan  (TAMUCC, SO, Pitcher)

Schedule and results

Schedule Source:*Rankings are based on the team's current ranking in the NFCA/USA Softball poll.

References

Incarnate Word
Incarnate Word Cardinals softball
Incarnate Word Cardinals softball